Weenen is a settlement in KwaZulu-Natal, South Africa.

Weenen may also refer to:

 Weenen massacre, a massacre of Voortrekkers by the Zulu
 Weenen-Kliprivier Commando, a regiment of the South African Army
 Edward van Weenen (1847–1925), an Australian philatelist
 John van Weenen (born 1941), an 8th Dan karateka and humanitarian